Victoria Sports Pro Cycling, also known as the Victoria Sports Cycling Team (VSCT) is a Philippine UCI Continental cycling team.

History
Victoria Sports Pro Cycling was established by New San Jose Builders and is backed by various private firms as sponsors. It became the third UCI Continental Philippine-based team following 7-Eleven Roadbike Philippines and Go for Gold. The cycling team was officially launched on January 21, 2023 with its initial roster composed of Filipino and Portuguese cyclists introduced.

Team roster

References

External links

UCI Continental Teams (Asia)
Cycling teams based in the Philippines
2023 establishments in the Philippines
Cycling teams established in 2023